Stephanie Ho (Chinese; 何雁詩, born 2 November 1992) is a Hong Kong singer, actress and golfer.

Early life 
Stephanie Ho was born in San Jose, California, but she grew up in Hong Kong with her parents. Her father is a businessman. Since a young age, she has been playing golf and has represented Hong Kong in many tournaments. Her parents wanted her to be a professional golfer but she chose to be a singer instead.

She studied at Heep Yunn School and Sha Tin College but was home-schooled in her last year due to her busy schedule of maintaining singing and studying. When she was 14, she started learning music at Baron School of Music, and completed multiple singing courses as well as being largely featured in a concept album.

After completing her A-Levels she decided to study hotel and tourism management at Hong Kong Polytechnic University. In her last year of university, she suspended her studies as she had been majorly cast in Gilded Chopsticks.

Besides playing golf, she also learnt how to play wood ball and represented her university in competitions and won awards.

Golf 
Stephanie started playing golf when she was 6, and entered many tournaments. At the age of 10, she joined the Hong Kong National Golf Team, and later became a Hong Kong Ladies Champion Golfer, but stopped playing when she was 18. In 2009, she was the record winner of the Hong Kong Ladies Close Amateur Championship. In the 2010 Asian Games, she ranked 26th out of 30 in the individual event and 8th out of 10 in the team event. She also played on the Hong Kong team at the Espirito Santos Trophy (World Amateur Championships) in 2010.

Due to her parents' influence, Ho learned to play golf at a young age. Although she did not continue professionally playing after entering the entertainment industry, she occasionally practises golf with friends.

Since 2011, she was a professional golfer, but in December 2017, she officially changed from a professional golfer back to an amateur golfer to give herself more chances to participate in local competitions. She consequently announced she would be participating in an amateur golf competition. On 3–5 January 2018, she competed and won the Hong Kong Ladies Close Amateur Championship for the second time after winning it in 2009, and played her first golf competition since 2010. She was invited to play in the 2018 Hong Kong Ladies Open alongside childhood best friend and LPGA player Tiffany Chan. After making her comeback in golf, she also returned to her position as a Hong Kong National Golf Ladies' Squad Team representative.

Personal life

Friendship 
When filming Raising The Bar, Ho became best friends with Jeannie Chan and Moon Lau. She also shared an apartment with Jeannie Chan for a year (2015-2016). She is also close with others in the entertainment industry including Winki Lai, Sisley Choi, Anjaylia Chan, Cheronna Ng, Fred Cheung, Joey Law, Dickson Yu, Mayao Ma, Grace Chan, Adrian Chau, Daniel Chau and William Chak. In the music industry, she is good friends with Hubert Wu, Kayee Tam, James Ng, Sophy Wong, Alfred Hui and Jason Chan.

In 2020, Ho, along with Winki Lai, Sisley Choi, Jeannie Chan, Anjaylia Chan and Cheronna Ng named their friendship group 'SÏXTERS'.

Relationship 
On 21 September 2015, Ho went public with her relationship with Korean-Japanese boyfriend, Wataru Yu. In mid-late 2016, she admitted their breakup.

On 6 April 2017, Ho admitted her relationship with fellow singer, Fred Cheng. On 1 January 2020, Ho and Cheng announced their engagement along with pre-wedding photos on Instagram, also revealing Cheng had proposed while they were on holiday in Thailand. The couple married on 7 November 2020 and held their wedding at Hyatt Regency Sha Tin, Hong Kong.

On 13 January 2022, Ho announced on Instagram that she is pregnant. On 4 June, the couple announced on Instagram that their son, Asher Douglas Cheng, was born on 1 June 2022.

Depression 
On 31 March 2017, Ho posted on Instagram that she would be resigning from upcoming drama My Ages Apart due to private illness. Days later, she admitted on Instagram that she had been suffering from emotional illness as she received tremendous pressure from the public regarding her private life and health. While being interviewed at an event on 31 December 2017, she said that she had recovered from depression but was still taking medication.

Music

Career Beginnings/Debut: 2009–2014 
When Ho was 16, she entered Hong Kong's The Voice in 2009 as a contestant, which started off her singing career. Although she didn't win, she gained fame and support from the public and also received an award for being in the Top 5 viral songs sung on the show. In 2013, she signed with MusicNext and released her first single "淚如鐵". In 2014, she officially debuted as a singer and achieved multiple best new artist awards. She released her first album, STEP, on 28 November 2014.

Voice Entertainment/Rise in Popularity: 2016–2019 
The following year, Ho ended her contract with MusicNext and signed with Voice Entertainment. She officially joined on 24 March 2015 but did not release her first single with the company until 2016 due to her busy schedule of filming dramas. After releasing "最真心一對" (True Lovers), she received positive feedback and continued to sing many drama theme songs. In November, she starred in the drama Dead Wrong as well as singing the ending theme song, "愛需要勇氣" (Love Takes Courage), which topped multiple charts and rose to popularity. In the 2016 TVB Anniversary Awards, "愛需要勇氣" reached Top 3 out of 38 nominations for the award of Favourite TVB Drama Theme Song. In the JSG Awards Presentation 2016 she received a gold song award for "愛需要勇氣" and an outstanding performance award.

On 24 January 2017, she released her second album, Lost In Love, which reached No.1 Album in Asian Pop at HMV. It also came in 1st runner-up in the KKBOX Top Albums of 2017. In March, she sang a duet with Fred Cheng, "真心真意" (With All My Heart), as the theme song for Married but Available. In May, she sang "我不會撒嬌" (I Would Not Pout) as the opening theme song for My Unfair Lady. The music video received more than 1 million views in less than a month. It topped Itunes, KKBOX, JOOX, MOOV charts as well as achieving a gold song award at the annual JSG Awards Presentation 2017. It also became one of the Top 10 HK Youtube Music Videos of 2017. On June 24, she released "愛近在眼前" (In Front Of Love) as the ending theme song for Legal Mavericks, this also being the second part of her hit song "愛需要勇氣" (Love Takes Courage). She has received nominations for all drama songs in award ceremonies.

On 17 June 2018, she performed as a special guest at William So's Father's Day Concert in New York City. On 9 September, she also performed as a special guest at Johnson Lee's Daikin Family Concert. On 22 December 2018, she held her first concert with boyfriend, Fred Cheng, in Los Angeles.

On 28 June 2019, Ho released her first single in two years, 包庇 (Tear Can't Speak), working with well-known music producer, Schumann (舒文). On October 8, she released "我會想念他" (Thoughts Of Love) as the ending theme song of Finding Her Voice.

On Voice Entertainment's YouTube channel, her most popular songs are "最真心一對" (True Lovers) (5.9M+ views), "愛需要勇氣" (Love Takes Courage) (4.3M+ views) and "我不會撒嬌" (I Would Not Pout) (3.2M+ views).

On 30 November 2019, she posted on Instagram announcing she had ended her contract with Voice Entertainment.

Independent Singer: 2020–present 
On 11 March 2020, Ho released her first single as an independent singer, "致有夢想的人", written and produced by Cousin Fung. On 26 June 2020, Ho released "絕望時請點播", which was co-written by herself and Cousin Fung, and was produced by Randy Chow. On 10 August 2020, she released the ending theme song of Al Cappuccino, 對手戲 (Opponent), her last drama song with Voice Entertainment. On 19 October 2020, she released "基本戀愛套路", which she also co-wrote with Cousin Fung. On 14 March 2021, she independently released her fourth song, "灰夠". On 15 April 2020, she released her EP, Que Será, Será, which comprised all the songs she had released as an independent singer.

On 26 July 2021, she announced on Instagram that she had completed her contract with TVB, for which she had been signed to for 12 years.

Discography

Albums

Other songs/singles

Acting

Beginnings: 2009–2013 
Ho was only 16 when she participated in The Voice. Subsequently, she signed a contract with TVB which led her into the entertainment industry. Due to balancing her studies, she started off part time, hosting music and travel shows with fellow singers and having cameo appearances in dramas.

Participating in Dramas: 2014–2019 
In 2014, she scored her first major role in Gilded Chopsticks, acting alongside Wong Cho-lam, which allowed audiences to recognize her as an actress. In 2015, she acted as one of the four main leads in the legal drama, Raising The Bar, as well as singing the opening theme song "我和你" (You & I). While filming the drama, she became best friends with her co-stars, Jeannie Chan, Moon Lau and Grace Chan, and also received a Best Supporting Actress and Most Popular Female Character nomination at the 2015 TVB Anniversary Awards.

In 2016, she continued to be cast in dramas such as Love as a Predatory Affair and Dead Wrong, giving her audience a good impression and performance. In 2017, she participated in Recipes to Live By, and received a Best Supporting Actress nomination at the 2017 TVB Anniversary Awards. She was offered a supporting role in the anniversary drama, My Ages Apart, but had to resign after filming a few scenes due to mental illness. Despite her illness, she went to Hengdian to finish filming Succession War, playing the role of Gurun Princess Hexiao which later aired in June 2018.

After being inactive in filming dramas for a year, she announced in June 2018 she would be participating in a new drama, Finding Her Voice, which aired in October 2019.

Hosting: 2012–2020 
Besides acting, Ho also hosts variety, comedy, travel and music shows. During the start of her career, Ho hosted multiple shows with fellow singers. In 2016, she hosted many episodes of I Heart HK with host Eric Tsang as well as many other artistes. In October 2016, Ho, Fred Cheng and Kayee Tam went to Alaska to film travel show, Anchors With Passport 3, which aired in February 2017. In October 2017, she was one of the hosts of the magic show, The Ultimate Street Sorcerer, collaborating with renowned Hong Kong magician Louis Yan. In 2019, she became a guest host of variety show, Liza's Online, working with Liza Wang.

Filmography

TVB

Television Dramas

Host

Film

Music Awards

2010 
 The Voice (Hong Kong) – Top 5 Viral Songs (On My Own)
 Approaching The Youngsters Music Contest 2010 (CMB Korea) – 1st Runner-up (Silver) with Alfred Hui
 2010 JSG Selections Part 1 – Song (Supervoice) with singers from The Voice (Hong Kong)
 JSG Awards Presentation 2010 – Outstanding Performance Award (Silver) with singers from The Voice (Hong Kong)

2012 
 Metro Showbiz Hit Children's Songs 2010 – Hit Children's Song Award (Go! Go! Sunshine)

2014 
 Metro Showbiz Hit Awards 2014 – New Female Debut Singer Award (Gold)
 Metro Showbiz Hit Awards 2014 – Hit Duet Award (線上情歌) with Fred Cheung
 RTHK Top 10 Gold Songs Awards 2014 – Most Promising Future Newcomer Award (Bronze) 
 Canada Most Hit Cantonese Song Charts – Canada's Most Praised New Female Artist 
 JSG Awards Presentation 2014 – Most Popular New Artist (Bronze)
 IFPI Hong Kong Sales Awards 2014 – Bestselling Female Newcomer Award

2016 
 2016 JSG Selections Part 1 – Song (最真心一對) (True Lovers)
 2016 JSG Selections Part 2 – Song (只想可以跟你走) (Take Me With You)
 King of Music Global Chinese Music Awards – Best Progress Award
 Metro Showbiz Hit Awards 2016 – Metro Top 12 Singers
 JSG Awards Presentation 2016 – Outstanding Performance Award
 JSG Awards Presentation 2016 – Gold Song (愛需要勇氣) (Love Takes Courage)
 Cantonese Song Charts Awards – Outstanding Progress Award

2017 
 2017 JSG Selections Part 1 – Song (我不會撒嬌) (I Would Not Pout)
 Chinese Golden Melody Awards 2017 – Jumping Singer Award
 2017 JSG Selections Part 2 – Song (愛近在眼前) (In Front Of Love)
Youtube Top 10 HK Music Video – 9th Place (我不會撒嬌) (I Would Not Pout)
 JSG Awards Presentation 2017 – Gold Song (我不會撒嬌) (I Would Not Pout)

2020 

 2020 JSG Selections Part 1 – Song (致有夢想的人)
AEG Music Channel Awards 2020 – Diamond Female Singer-Songwriter Award
AEG Music Channel Awards 2020 – Diamond Popular Idol Award
2020 JSG Selections Part 2 – Song (對手戲) (Opponent)
Metro Showbiz Hit Awards 2020 – Hit Independent Musician Award
JSG Awards Presentation 2020 – Gold Song (對手戲) (Opponent)

Film Awards and Nominations

Starhub TVB Awards

TVB Star Awards Malaysia

TVB Anniversary Awards

References

External links

Stephanie Ho on Instagram
 Stephanie Ho on YouTube
Stephanie Ho on Facebook
Stephanie Ho on Weibo

Living people
1992 births
Cantopop singers
Actresses from San Jose, California
21st-century American women
American born Hong Kong artists